The Exorcism of Anna Ecklund is a 2016 British horror film written and directed by Andrew Jones. The plot is based on the alleged true story of Anna Ecklund.

Synopsis 
A local priest and an investigator from the Vatican team up to help discover whether a formerly gentle wife and mother is truly possessed by an ancient evil. Upon realizing that this is the case, the two try to take the woman, Anna Ecklund, to a convent to perform an exorcism. Unwilling to let its prey loose, the evil launches an assault against the priests.

Cast

Production 
Filming took place in Mumbles, Wales. Tiffany Ceri was brought on to play the titular character of Anna Ecklund. She found the role interesting "because it was so varied" and that "The scenes were quite crazy and manic and took up a lot of energy and physical strength as well. There was a lot of screaming and shouting and I decided to stay in character which was hard because it was so intense."

Release 
The Exorcism of Anna Ecklund was released in the United Kingdom on 7 March 2016. The film was later released in the United States on 5 April of the same year.

Reception 
Film critic Samantha McLaren of Scream was critical of the movie, writing that "Clocking in at just seventy-five minutes, at least fifteen of which were eaten up by long and boring opening and closing credits and even more by its endless padding scenes, The Exorcism of Anna Ecklund barely feels like a film at all." The reviewer for HorrorNews.net was also critical, negatively comparing it to The Exorcist and stating that viewers should "Pass on this timid and tiresome film that adds nothing to the possession genre and go watch the original “The Exorcist” again."

Jason Rhode of Cryptic Rock was more favorable, opining in their review that "Ultimately, The Exorcism of Anna Ecklund is interesting since it is based on a true story, flows evenly, and has a solid soundtrack. However, as stated, the plot has been done, so unless this scenario’s common for all exorcisms, audiences might give it cursory watch; then, put in The Exorcism of Emily Rose. Nonetheless, Horror fans who dig films about demonic possession should absolutely check the film out."

The film received negative reviews on IMDb and per Screen Rant, was one of the ten lowest rated horror films as of 2019, summarizing by writing "If you're wondering what makes this movie different from the other exorcism movies, the answer is nothing. As one viewer wrote on the IMDb page, "Girl is possessed, priests get 'clearance' to perform exorcism, demon possesses the priests, rinse and repeat.""

References

External links 
 
 The Exorcism of Anna Ecklund on Letterboxd

2016 films
2016 horror films
2016 independent films
2010s supernatural horror films
British supernatural horror films
British independent films
Films set in 1928
Horror films based on actual events
Demons in film
The Devil in film
Films about exorcism
Films about Catholicism
2010s English-language films
Films directed by Andrew Jones
2010s British films